Myopa clausa is a species of thick-headed flies in the family Conopidae.

Distribution
Canada, United States.

References

Conopidae
Taxa named by Hermann Loew
Insects described in 1866
Diptera of North America